In astronomy, Joy's law describes the distribution of sunspots in active regions and states that the magnitude at which the sunspots are "tilted"—with the leading spot(s) closer to the  equator than the trailing spot(s)―grows with the latitude of these regions.  Joy's law provides observational support for the operation of the "alpha effect" in solar dynamo action. It is named after Alfred Harrison Joy.

References

Solar phenomena